Southkhali Union is a union parishad of Sarankhola Upazila, Bagerhat District in Khulna Division of Bangladesh. It has an area of 95.05 km2 (36.70 sq mi) and a population of 29,100.

References

Unions of Sarankhola Upazila
Unions of Bagerhat District
Unions of Khulna Division